Possum Corner is an unincorporated community in Wilkinson County, Mississippi, United States.

The Homochitto River flows north of the settlement.

Several oil fields are located nearby, including the Possum Corner Oil Field, the West Possum Corner Oil Field, and the South Possum Corner Oil Field.

References

Unincorporated communities in Wilkinson County, Mississippi
Unincorporated communities in Mississippi